Rhyan is a given name and surname. Notable people with the name include:

Rhyan Grant (born 1991), Australian footballer
Rhyan Mansell (born 2000), Australian rules footballer
Rhyan White (born 2000), American swimmer
Sean Rhyan (born 2000), American football player

See also
Ryan (given name)
Ryan (surname)